The 2013 IAAF Hammer Throw Challenge was the fourth edition of the annual, global series of hammer throw competitions organised by the International Association of Athletics Federations. The winners were Paweł Fajdek (244.23 metres) and Anita Włodarczyk (233.83 metres), both of Poland. Both the final scores were records for the challenge.

A total of fifteen meetings featured on the circuit, with nine women's and nine men's contests spread across those events. The point scoring format was cumulative – the final standings were decided by the sum of athletes' three best throws on the circuit. Only the best throw by an athlete from each meet was taken into consideration.

Calendar
The 2013 edition marked a move away from the series' alignment with the IAAF World Challenge circuit. Instead, the series was expanded and featured nine World Challenge meetings, one IAAF Diamond League meeting (Prefontaine Classic), and four non-IAAF meetings in Europe. Performances at the 2013 World Championships in Athletics were also included in series for the first time. The Rieti Meeting leg spanned two days, with a qualification round and a final the following day.

New additions to the tour included the Ponce Grand Prix de Atletismo, IAAF World Challenge Beijing, Moscow Challenge, Janusz Kusociński Memorial, István Gyulai Memorial, Karlstad Grand Prix and the Athletics Bridge. The Colorful Daegu Pre-Championships meet, Hanžeković Memorial and Meeting de Atletismo Madrid were dropped.

Final standings

Men
A total of twelve men recorded valid marks at three meetings and made the final standings.

Women
A total of eleven women recorded valid marks at three meetings and made the final standings.

References

2013
IAAF Hammer Throw Challenge